Veiko is an Estonian masculine given name.

People named Veiko include:
Veiko Belials (born 1966), writer and translator
Veiko Lember (born 1977), volleyball player
Veiko Õunpuu (born 1972), film director and screenwriter 
Veiko-Vello Palm (born 1971), brigadier general 
Veiko Porkanen (born 1989), actor 
Veiko Siimar (born 1941), swimmer

References

Estonian masculine given names